Bennett Koch (born May 25, 1995) is an American basketball player who plays for Sheffield Sharks. He played college basketball for Northern Iowa.

College career
Koch played five seasons for the Northern Iowa Panthers, including a redshirt season in 2013–14. As a freshman, he played behind Seth Tuttle on the NCAA Round of 32 team. Koch broke into the starting lineup as a sophomore and averaged 7.6 points per game. In his final season with Norther Iowa, Koch averaged 12.7 points and 6.1 rebounds per game.

College statistics

|-
| style="text-align:left;"| 2014–15
| style="text-align:left;"| Northern Iowa
| 28 || 0 || 4.1 || .536 || .000 || .529 || 0.6 || 0 || 0 || .1 || 1.4
|-
| style="text-align:left;"| 2015–16
| style="text-align:left;"| Northern Iowa
| 36 || 36 || 18.8 || .497 || .000 || .740 || 2.6 || .4 || .3 || .4 || 7.6
|-
| style="text-align:left;"| 2016–17
| style="text-align:left;"| Northern Iowa
| 29 || 26 || 20.3 || .570 || .000 || .762 || 3.8 || .5|| .5 || .7 || 11.0
|-
| style="text-align:left;"| 2017–18
| style="text-align:left;"| Northern Iowa
| 31 || 23 || 24.2 || .556 || .000 || .734 || 6.1 || .5 ||.7 || .8 || 12.7
|- class="sortbottom"
| colspan=2 style="text-align:center;"| Career
| 124 || 85 || 17.2 || .542 || .000 || .736 || 3.6 || .4 || .4 || .5 || 8.3

Professional career
On July 30, Koch signed a one-year contract with Dutch Windmills of the Dutch Basketball League (DBL). On 10 April 2019, Windmills withdrew from the DBL due to its financial problems.

On August 7, 2019, Koch signed with Sheffield Sharks of the British Basketball League (BBL). He re-signed with Sheffield on September 7, 2021.

Personal life
Koch's older brothers Adam and Jake also played at the University of Northern Iowa.

References

External links
Northern Iowa Panthers bio

1995 births
Living people
American expatriate basketball people in the Netherlands
American expatriate basketball people in the United Kingdom
American men's basketball players
Basketball players from Wisconsin
Dutch Basketball League players
Dutch Windmills players
Sheffield Sharks players
Northern Iowa Panthers men's basketball players
People from Ashwaubenon, Wisconsin
Power forwards (basketball)